Paul Brittain (born February 16, 1977) is an American actor and comedian. Brittain is best known for his brief tenure as a cast member on the NBC sketch comedy series Saturday Night Live from 2010 to 2012.

Early life and education
Brittain was born and raised in Naperville, Illinois.<ref name=FabFour>Moynihan, Rob. "SNL'''s Fab Four", TV Guide, March 7, 2011, Pages 44-45</ref> He graduated from Naperville North High School in 1995. He attended the University of Illinois at Urbana–Champaign, where he majored in finance and Spanish, graduating in 2000.

 Career 
He is a veteran performer at the iO Theater in Chicago where he trained with SNL castmate Vanessa Bayer and performed as a member with numerous improv and sketch groups. He has appeared on Sports Action Team.

Brittain is the nephew of actor Bob Newhart.

Saturday Night Live
Brittain joined the cast of Saturday Night Live for the 36th season on September 25, 2010. His most memorable recurring characters included Lord Cecil Wyndemere (a childlike, 48-year-old lord), Goran "Funky Boy" Bogdan (a Croatian stand-up comic who punctuates his jokes with "Oooh, funky boy!"), and "Sex Ed" Vincent (a low-rent sex counselor who holds seminars in shady hotels). Brittain's popular celebrity impressions included Ron Paul, James Franco, and Johnny Depp. Brittain's uncle, Bob Newhart hosted SNL in its fifth (1979–1980) and 20th (1994–1995) seasons, making Brittain the second SNL cast member to be the nephew of a celebrity who hosted SNL more than once (after Jason Sudeikis, whose uncle is semi-frequent 1990s host George Wendt).

Brittain exited SNL'' midway through his second season, making his final appearance on January 14, 2012.

Recurring characters
Marius, one of French teens in "Les Jeunes de Paris"
 Goran "Funky Boy" Bogdan, a Croatian stand-up comic
 "Sex" Ed Vincent, a middle-aged "sex expert" who holds couples seminars
 Lord Cecil Wyndemere, a foppish man-child who's actually 48 years old

Celebrity impressions
Johnny Depp
James Franco
Vili Fualaau
Harry Reid
Dax Holt
Ron Paul
Michael Gelman
Osama bin Laden
Tom Felton (as Draco Malfoy)

Filmography

Film

Television

References

External links

1977 births
Living people
Male actors from Naperville, Illinois
American sketch comedians
American male television actors
University of Illinois Urbana-Champaign alumni
21st-century American male actors
American impressionists (entertainers)
Comedians from Illinois
21st-century American comedians